Tavistock Goose Fair, known locally as Goosey, or Goosie, Fair, is the annual fair in the stannary town of Tavistock in the west of Devon, England. It has been held on the second Wednesday of October since 1823 and it is one of only three historically established traditional fairs in the UK to carry the name, the other being the larger Nottingham Goose Fair, and the smaller Michaelmas Goose Fayre in Colyford, also in Devon.

History
Tavistock Goose Fair is one of the best known fairs in the West Country and has its ancient origins in the Michelmas fair that first came into being in the early 12th century. Adoption of the Gregorian calendar by Britain in 1752 necessitated a correction to the established dates of charter fairs, in this case moving Tavistock's fair from Michelmas day (29 September) to October 10. Whilst there appears to be little published evidence of the name ‘Goosey Fair’ prior to the first decade of the 20th century, it seems likely that the name was in use locally in the eighteenth century.

The goose name itself probably arose out of the old tradition of buying geese at the Michelmas market to be fattened ready for Christmas Day as goose was the fowl of choice for the dinner table long before the arrival of the turkey from North America. An alternative theory is that the name is a corruption of St Eustachius  (Saint Eustace), the Patron Saint of the Parish church whose day fell on 20 September, close to Michelmas. The livestock market on Whitchurch Road continues the tradition with live geese and poultry being available for sale at public auction on the day itself, whilst some of the town's cafés and restaurants usually offer special goose themed menus.

Historically, the fair was mainly attended by the townsfolk, but the mix of visiting gypsy travellers, showmen, local miners and sailors from Devonport gave the fair a reputation for drunken behaviour and fighting. From the mid-1850s to the late 1960s, the Southern and GWR railway lines that once served Tavistock brought people in from outlying villages and the town's platforms were often awash with litter and drunken stragglers by the end of the day. Unlike today, in the early 20th century, people from other surrounding villages did not always travel to the fair partly because of its reputation but also from the fact that the journey had to be made on foot in the days before public road transport. The fair's rowdy atmosphere must have been in stark contrast to the more genteel charabanc picnic outings and paddle steamer excursions that were popular in the Tamar Valley area during the Edwardian era.

This fair went on hiatus in 1915–18, 1940–45 & 2020.

"Tavvystock Goozey Vair"

The narrative folk song "Tavvystock Goozey Vair", first published in 1912 (words and music by C. John Trythall), is thought by some to be an older traditional song than "Widecombe Fair" and is still sung. There is a suggestion that the song was known in the years before publication and that Trythall was the first to document it. If true, it seems an oversight on the part of Rev. Sabine Baring-Gould to have omitted it from his folk song collections. Another theory holds that the song was composed by Trythall as a tribute to the people of Tavistock. Little is known of Trythall's identity, but the British Library Integrated Catalogue lists two other local songs by Trythall, both published in 1916, "The Dinky Farm nigh Burrator" and "Down 'pon ole Dartymoor". "Tavistock Gossey Fair" was recorded by the Yetties in 2001 (LP GRCD111 Grasmere Music Ltd). A version by Bob Cann and an unnamed singer recorded by Keith Summers is held by the British Library Sound Archive

Goose Fair on film
Directed by Clive Gunnell and produced by Westward Television, an award-winning regional TV documentary film "To Tavistock Goosey Fair"  was made in 1977 and was later published as a companion book.

The  BFI has limited footage of the fair dating from 1975 

Local TV news bulletins typically have annual coverage exploring different aspects of the fair.

The Fair today
The fair traditionally provided a forum for trading in livestock and other business activities and has since become a regular social festival for the community and large numbers of visitors drawn from the surrounding areas. Local schools hold an inset day so that children can have the day off. The fair today attracts market traders from all over the UK whose stalls line Abbey Bridge and stretch along the length of Plymouth Road, interspersed with smaller fairground rides. Visitors to the fair will be keen to spot the year's most prominent 'must have' fad gadget or toy craze adorning the stalls; folding scooters, laser pens, yo-yos and tamagotchis have all had their respective years of dominance. As well as the usual abundance of doughnut, hot dog, onion and candyfloss smells, representative food from the fair might include a roast pork roll washed down with a glass of warmed spiced cider.

The Wharf and Bedford car parks are taken over for the week by the main travelling funfair that is run by the western section of the Showmen's Guild of Great Britain. With its brightly lit amusements, stalls and noisy rides, the funfair provides the principal source of entertainment well into the night, long after the market stalls have been packed away.

A long-standing local joke that "Goosie Fair is not as good as it used to be" is questionable given that the annual fair's continued popularity always draws huge crowds whatever the autumn weather decides to throw at the people of Tavistock.

References

External links 
 Legendary Dartmoor website
 Tavistock Town Council Goose Fair webpage
 BBC Devon in pictures Goosey Fair 2009 photos webpage
 Tavistock Goosey Fair folk song British Library Recording

Annual fairs
Festivals in Devon
Dartmoor
Fairs in England
Annual events in England
Tavistock
Festivals established in 1823
Autumn events in England